Goldsby is a surname. Notable people with the surname include:

Bryan Goldsby (born 1982), American mixed martial artist
Crawford Goldsby (1876–1896), American outlaw
Doug Goldsby (born 1986), Canadian football player
Richard Goldsby, American biologist
Robin Meloy Goldsby, American pianist and composer
Walt Goldsby (1861–1914), American baseball player